Lithuania national beach soccer team represents Lithuania in international beach soccer competitions and is controlled by the Lithuanian Football Federation (LFF), the governing body for football in Lithuania.

Squad
Correct as of June 2020

Head Coaches: 
  Sahib Mammadov (2019 -)
  Nerijus Budraitis (2017 - 2019)
  Bronislavas Mickevičius (2014-2016)

Achievements
 FIFA Beach Soccer World Cup qualification (UEFA) best: Group Stage
 2008, 2017

Results

All Time Record
as of July 2014

World Cup qualifier

2023

References

 Squad
 2010 results
 2011 results
 2013 results
 2014 results

Beach Soccer
European national beach soccer teams